Mykhailivka is an urban-type settlement in Alchevsk Raion (district) in Luhansk Oblast of eastern Ukraine. Population: 

Until 18 July 2020, Mykhailivka was located in Perevalsk Raion. The raion was abolished in July 2020 as part of the administrative reform of Ukraine, which reduced the number of raions of Luhansk Oblast to eight, of which only four were controlled by the government. The area of Perevalsk Raion was merged into Alchevsk Raion. However, the area of raion is controlled by the Luhansk People's Republic, which continues to use the old, pre-2020 administrative divisions of Ukraine.

Demographics
Native language distribution as of the Ukrainian Census of 2001:
 Ukrainian: 64.46%
 Russian: 35.12%
 Others 0.21%

Notable people
Natalia Poklonskaya (born 1980), politician and diplomat

References

Urban-type settlements in Alchevsk Raion